Foster was a railway station on the South Gippsland line in South Gippsland, Victoria, Australia. The station was opened during the 1890s operated until 1992 when the line to Barry Beach servicing the oil fields in Bass Strait was closed. The line was dismantled and turned into the Great Southern Rail Trail.

Disused railway stations in Victoria (Australia)
Transport in Gippsland (region)
Shire of South Gippsland